Vs. the Snow is the first full-length album by the Malmö, Sweden-based indie pop band The LK. It was released on April 4, 2007, with a U.S. reissue on March 4, 2008.

The album has eleven songs with a dreamlike atmosphere, expressed by loops and minimal sounds. The album builds upon the foundations of the band's earlier work – clean song craft, simple melodies and Scandinavian melancholy.

Track listing
 "Anorak and Other Complicated Words Beginning With An A" - 1:39
 "Eurovision" - 4:32
 "Tamagotchi Freestyle" - 3:44
 "Down By Law" - 4:08
 "Stop Being Perfect" - 3:46 (US release only)
 "Private Life of a Cat" - 3:40
 "Tandem Bikes" - 4:19
 "Transistor Tropics" - 5:16
 "The Love of Little Things" - 3:25
 "Blakboy Vs. The Snow" - 4:20
 "Yellow Ribbons" - 4:32

Notes

2008 albums